Adamstown Rosebud Football Club (founded July 12, 1889) is a semi-professional soccer club based in Adamstown a suburb of Newcastle, New South Wales. The club is part of Northern NSW Football and has teams competing in Senior and Youth NPL competitions. The club had played in the National Soccer League between 1984 and 1986 as Newcastle Rosebud United. Adamstown Rosebud is arguably the most famous football club in Newcastle and in 2019, the club entered its 130th year of competition, making the Rosebuds the oldest NPL club in Australia. To mark the occasion, the club wore a special commemorative strip that year, honouring its 130-year history and the Australian representatives the club has produced.

Current senior squad

Staff

Coaching
Head Coach: David Rosewarne
 1st Grade Assistant Coach: Chris Moylan
 Technical Director: Chris Dale

Honours
Northern NSW New FM Major Premier Champions 2013
Northern NSW New FM Minor Premier Champions 2013
Northern NSW New FM Minor Premier Champions 2008
National Soccer League Cup Winner 1984 (as Newcastle Rosebud United)

References

External links
Adamstown Rosebud divisional history
OzFootball list of cup winners
Adamstown Rosebud FC Website
Adamstown Rosebud Facebook Page
Adamstown Rosebud Twitter Account

Association football clubs established in 1889
National Premier Leagues clubs
Soccer clubs in Newcastle, New South Wales
1889 establishments in Australia
Sports teams in Newcastle, New South Wales